New Al Hitmi (also known as Al-Hitmi Al-Jadeed) is a district in Qatar, located in the municipality of Ad Dawhah. The name is derived from the Al-Hitmi family, which is a branch of the main Al Bin Ali tribe. Together with Fereej Bin Omran and Hamad Medical City, it forms Zone 37, which has a population of 26,121.

Geography
New Al Hitmi borders the following districts:
Hamad Medical City to the east, separated by Mohammed Bin Thani Street.
Al Sadd to the south, separated by Al Rayyan Road.
Al Messila to the west, separated by Jassim Bin Hamad Street.
Fereej Bin Omran to the north, separated by Al Yarmouk Street.

Landmarks
Al Hitmi Park on Athba Street.
Fahad Bin Jassim Kidney Centre on Al Rasheed Street.
American Education Centre on Jassim bin Hamad Street.
National Council For Culture, Arts and Heritage on Al Yamama Street.
Nasser Gardens on Mohammed bin Thani Street.
Friends of the Environment Centre on Al Rasheed Street.
Doha Youth Centre on Sahat Al Ikhlas Street.

See also
Old Al Hitmi

References

Communities in Doha